Charles Henry Parkhurst (April 17, 1842 – September 8, 1933) was an American clergyman and social reformer, born in Framingham, Massachusetts. Although scholarly and reserved, he preached two sermons in 1892 in which he attacked the political corruption of New York City government. Backed by the evidence he collected, his statements led to both the exposure of Tammany Hall and to subsequent social and political reforms.

Early years

He was born on a farm on April 17, 1842 in Framingham, Massachusetts. Parkhurst did not attend a formal school until he was twelve. Despite this, he showed a strong interest in education and graduated from Amherst College in 1866.  He became principal of the high school in Amherst in 1867. He married Ellen Bodman on November 23, 1870, she being one of his former students. Parkhurst studied theology at Halle in 1869, and became a professor at the Williston Seminary in Easthampton, Massachusetts, in 1870–1871.

After further studies in Leipzig in 1872–1873, he was ordained as a Presbyterian minister.  He was pastor of a congregational church at Lenox, Massachusetts, from 1874 until 1880, when he was called to the Madison Square Presbyterian Church, New York City, where he served from 1880 to 1918.

Later life

Interested in municipal affairs, Parkhurst was elected president of the New York Society for the Prevention of Crime in 1891, and he challenged the methods of the city police department.  He inaugurated a campaign against the political and social corruption of Tammany Hall.  The hall had begun innocuously as just a social club, but had drifted into politics and graft. It acquired a lock on elections in the city, and its bosses protected crime and vice in Manhattan and surrounding boroughs. Grand jury investigations were ineffective, despite the appeals of social reformers.  Few in Parkhurst's congregation recognized that Tammany Hall, the police, and organized crime were interconnected.

On February 14, 1892, he challenged Tammany Hall from the pulpit.  Pointing to the hall's political influence and their connection with the police, he noted that men fed upon the city while pretending to protect it saying,

When the municipal grand jury asked him for hard evidence, Parkhurst personally hired a private detective and, with his friend John Erving, went to the streets in disguise to collect proof of the corruption.  From the pulpit on March 13, 1892, he preached a sermon backed with documentation and affidavits.  Parkhurst's campaign led to the appointment of the Lexow Committee to investigate conditions, and to the election of a reform mayor in 1894.  Although Tammany Hall did publicly clean house, it remained influential on both the political front and in organized crime until the 1950s.

Women's suffrage

Parkhurst was opposed to women voting. He wrote:

"That quality of feminine blatancy which is being at present so extensively advertised here and in England, that disposition toward self-exploitation indulged in by short-haired women and encouraged by long-haired men, is of a sort to chill and then freeze over those masculine impulses that seek restful and satisfying companionship in a member of the opposite sex."

Family
His first wife, Ellen Bodman, died on May 28, 1921. He married Eleanor Marx on April 18, 1927, in Los Angeles.

Death
Parkhurst died on September 8, 1933, by sleepwalking off the porch roof in his Ventnor City, New Jersey, home.

See also
 Lexow Committee 1894 to 1895, a major New York State Senate probe into police corruption

References

Further reading

External links

 

Political history of New York City
People from Framingham, Massachusetts
Activists from Massachusetts
1842 births
1933 deaths
American sermon writers
American Presbyterian ministers
19th-century Presbyterian ministers
American autobiographers
Accidental deaths in New Jersey
Sleepwalking
Accidental deaths from falls
People from Ventnor City, New Jersey
American social reformers
People from Lenox, Massachusetts
Anti-crime activists
American anti-corruption activists
20th-century Presbyterian ministers
Writers from Massachusetts
19th-century American male writers
20th-century American male writers
20th-century American clergy
19th-century American clergy